Casey Stratton (born October 16, 1976) is a male pop/rock singer/songwriter/musician.

Background
Casey Stratton was born in Lansing, Michigan in 1976. He has lived in Los Angeles, California, Chicago, Illinois and New York City, New York. Stratton currently resides in Grand Rapids, Michigan.

Beginning violin lessons at the age of 8, Stratton followed quickly with lessons in the cello, piano, and guitar. It was through the piano that Stratton discovered a passion for writing and performing songs. After graduating from Michigan's Interlochen Arts Academy, Stratton moved to Los Angeles to pursue his career.  His first album release on a major label, "Standing at the Edge" for Sony Music Entertainment received positive reviews in magazines like People and Billboard.

Career

Casey began writing songs at the age of 11.  He first performed his own songs live while attending Interlochen Arts Academy at the age of 16.  The response lead Casey to begin contemplating becoming a professional singer/songwriter.  It was also during this time period that he began performing in Coffeehouses in Michigan.

After moving to Los Angeles in 1995, Casey quickly signed an independent recording contract with Magic Records.  Work then began on the recordings that would eventually become his first full-length release, The Giver and the Grave Digger, which was released in 1996.  In late 1995 Magic Records released Driving to the Moon EP which garnered considerable critical acclaim and exposure in the Los Angeles music scene.  This led to a string of live performances at the now defunct Luna Park venue.

In 1997, after deciding not to renew his contract with Magic Records, Casey began his first self-produced album, Lily Sleeps.  This project marked an experimental phase for Casey.  Over 90 tracks were written and recorded during this time.  While the album was never released in CD format, it is now available in the DIGITAL MUSIC STORE at www.caseystratton.com.

Also in 1997, Casey recorded a cover of the song Regret for Blue Order - A Trance Tribute to New Order.

The songs from Lily Sleeps gained some industry attention and Casey signed a publishing contract with Rondor Music Publishing in 1997.  It was during this time that Casey began recording Whirlwind Medusa. This is also when the first recordings of future favorites Hollow and House of Jupiter were completed.  In 1999 Casey was informed that his contract with Rondor Music Publishing would not be renewed.  This led to a dark period in the performer's life.  In the summer of 2000 Stratton moved to Chicago where he began a nearly two-year hiatus from the record industry.  He immersed himself in writing and recorded an independent album called The Winter Children.  Many of these tracks would be re-recorded later and included on his Sony release Standing at the Edge.

Casey returned to the recording industry in 2002.  Shortly after moving to New York City, Stratton inked a deal with Sony Music.  in January 2003 he flew to Los Angeles to begin recording Standing at the Edge with legendary producer Patrick Leonard. Originally intended for an August 2003 release, Standing at the Edge was initially delayed until October 2003.  Eventually the album would be delayed yet again and ultimately released in on January 20, 2004.

After Standing at the Edge, Stratton gained further success when the Junior Vasquez remix of "House Of Jupiter" went to #1 on the Billboard Dance chart, and remained there for 20 weeks in 2005. This was followed by Vazquez's remix of "Blood".  Casey left Sony Music in December 2004.  Stratton's 6th studio album, "DIVIDE", was released in October 2005 on Stratton's independent label, Sleeping Pill Music (ASCAP).  Casey also launched a comprehensive digital music store on his website that would include all of his early albums, various holiday recordings, EPs and live shows as well as his current release DIVIDE.  In March 2006 Casey recorded and released an album of traditional folk songs, The Sun is Burning,  including 3 new songs where Casey set 3 W.B Yeats poems to music.

The DIVIDE tour started on March 18, 2006, in Chicago, IL and completed all the East Coast dates with a performance in Atlanta. The West Coast portion of the tour began on April 27, 2006, in Los Angeles, California, ending in Portland, Oregon on May 6, 2006. A summer tour began on July 18, 2006, in Cleveland, OH and ended in Savannah, GA on July 28, 2006.

Stratton's album, The Crossing, was released in April 2007.  A tour was being planned but was eventually scrapped due to financial concerns.  Casey frequently discusses the strains of being an independent musician in these times and is in strong opposition to music piracy.

Casey's album, Orbit, was digitally released on February 5, 2008. This was followed by Signs of Life which was digitally released in August 2008 and physically released on CD in November.  Messages Sending digitally released in April 2009.  No plans are in place for a CD release at this time.

Casey started a Podcast in May 2008 in which he discusses his career and life in addition to live performances.

Memories and Photographs was released in September 2009, followed by A Winter Moon, an album of holiday music, in December 2009.  Casey's next project, Myth & Stars, largely based on Greek Mythology, was released on September 21, 2010.  A live DVD, Live at the Wealthy Theatre, was released in 2010 as well.

See also
List of number-one dance hits (United States)
List of artists who reached number one on the US Dance chart

References

External links
 Casey Stratton - official website
 Casey Stratton's Blog
 Casey Stratton - Yahoo! Group
 Casey Stratton at AllMusic
 Casey Stratton at Discogs

1976 births
Musicians from Grand Rapids, Michigan
Living people
Singers from Michigan
21st-century American singers
21st-century American male singers